Falsterbo Golf Club is a links golf club located in Falsterbo, Skåne County in Sweden. It has hosted the PLM Open on the European Tour.

History
Falsterbo was founded in 1909 and is Sweden's third oldest golf club. In 1911 it was moved a few hundred yards to its current location and the first 9 holes were constructed. The full 18 holes course was consecrated the summer of 1930. After a few changes, the course was finished in its current layout in 1934.

It is located on Sweden's southern tip, along the Baltic Sea, next to Falsterbo Lighthouse built in 1796. It is one of few links courses in Sweden and is repeatedly ranked one of the best courses in the country.

The club has hosted the PLM Open on the European Tour as well as the Skandia PGA Open on the Challenge Tour. It has also hosted many amateur tournaments such as the 1963 European Amateur Team Championship and the 2009 European Ladies Amateur Championship.

Tournaments hosted

Pre-European Tour
Volvo Open – 1971

European Tour
PLM Open – 1986

Challenge Tour Tour
Skandia PGA Open – 2003

Amateur 
Swedish Matchplay Championship – 1913191519171920193319371957
European Amateur Team Championship – 1963 
European Ladies Amateur Championship – 2009

Course Records
Men: 65 –  Oliver David and  Titch Moore, 2003 Skandia PGA Open
Women: 66 –  Caroline Hedwall, 2009 European Ladies Amateur Championship
Sources:

See also
List of links golf courses
List of golf courses in Sweden

References

External links

Golf clubs and courses in Sweden